Bucyk is a surname. Notable people with the surname include:

 Johnny Bucyk (born 1935), Canadian ice hockey player
 Randy Bucyk (born 1962), Canadian ice hockey player, nephew of Johnny

See also
 Buck (surname)